{{Infobox former country
| native_name            = 
| conventional_long_name = Ahom Kingdom
| common_name            = Ahom kingdom
| area_sq_mi             = 
| GDP_PPP                = 
| status                 = Historical sovereign state
| event_start            = Established by Sukaphaa
| year_start             = 1228
| event1                 = Re-organization under King Suhungmung
| date_event1            = 1497
| event2                 = Koch-Ahom conflicts
| date_event2            = 1543–68
| event3                 = Ahom–Mughal conflicts
| date_event3            = 1615–1682
| event4                 = Death of Rudra Singha<ref>"After the exit of king Rudra Singha the history of Ahoms proved one to be of internal strife and dissensions, downfall and disintegration.</ref>
| date_event4            = 1714
| event5                 = Moamaria rebellion
| date_event5            = 1769
| event6                 = Burmese invasion of Assam
| date_event6            = 1817
| event_end              = Britain seizes control
| year_end               = 1826
| image_coat             = Ahom_insignia_plain.svg
| national_motto         = 
| motto                  = 
| image_map              = 
| image_map_caption      = The Ahom Kingdom, 1826.
| capital                = 
| common_languages       = 
Assamese (lingua franca)
Ahom

| religion               = 
Ahom religion
Ekasarana Dharma
Shaktism
Islam

| demonym                = Assamese
| government_type        = Aristocratic monarchy
| leader1                = Sukaphaa
| year_leader1           = 1228–1268
| leader2                = Suhungmung
| year_leader2           = 1497–1539
| leader3                = Susenghphaa
| year_leader3           = 1603–1641
| leader4                = Sukhrungphaa
| year_leader5           = 1833–1838
| leader5                = Purandar Singha
| year_leader4           = 1696–1714
| title_leader           = Chao Pha, Swargadeo
| p1                     = Kamarupa Kingdom
| s1                     = Konbaung Dynasty
| flag_s1                = National_flag_of_Third_Burmese_Empire_(Konbaung_Dynasty).svg
| s2                     = Colonial Assam
| flag_s2                = Flag of British Bengal.svg
| today                  = IndiaMyanmar
| stat_area1             = 
| stat_area2             = 41957.807
| stat_year1             = 1711
| stat_year2             = 1826
| stat_pop1              = 2,880,000
}}

The Ahom kingdom (1228–1826) was a late medieval kingdom in the Brahmaputra Valley in Assam. It maintained its sovereignty for nearly 600 years having successfully resisted Mughal expansion in Northeast India. Established by Sukaphaa, a Tai prince from Mong Mao (present-day Yunnan Province, China), it began as a mong in the upper reaches of the Brahmaputra based on wet rice agriculture. It expanded suddenly under Suhungmung in the 16th century and became multi-ethnic in character, casting a profound effect on the political and social life of the entire Brahmaputra valley. The kingdom became weaker with the rise of the Moamoria rebellion, and subsequently fell to repeated Burmese invasions of Assam. With the defeat of the Burmese after the First Anglo-Burmese War and the Treaty of Yandabo in 1826, control of the kingdom passed into East India Company hands.

Though it came to be called the Ahom kingdom in the colonial and subsequent times, it was largely multi-ethnic, with the ethnic Tai-Ahom people constituting less than 10% of the population toward the end.
People from different ethnic groups became a part of the Ahom population due to the process known as Ahomisation. The identity of the Ahom people in this kingdom was fluid, with the king controlling who belonged to it and who did not. The Ahoms initially called their kingdom Mong Dun Shun Kham till 1401, but adopted Assam in later times. The British-controlled province after 1838 and later the Indian state of Assam came to be known by this name. The kingdom maintained close political ties with other Tai-states especially with Mong Kwang (Nara) till the end of its rule in the 19th century.

History

The Ahom kingdom was established in 1228 when Sukaphaa, a Tai prince, entered the Brahmaputra valley having crossed the rugged Patkai mountain range from Mong Mao. During Sukaphaa's journey from his homeland he was supported and joined by other Tai chiefs and common followers totaling about 480 to 9,000 persons. His destiny was Upper Assam, earlier the domain of the Kamarupa kingdom but which had since lapsed into retarded conditions, and his intention was not to conquer and raid but to permanently settle in fallow land and practice agriculture.  The Tai-shans had with them the basic political structures for state-building, surplus producing technologies such as sedentary wet-rice cultivation and hydrology, a patriarchal social organisation based on chiefs, and a literary form of their language.  Whereas the earlier state formations (Kamarupa) borrowed political structures from North India that led to Indo-Aryan domination, the Ahom state formation provided an alternate model built on Southeast Asian political structures, and which provided the space for the development of a distinct political, social and cultural identity. Though Brahminical myth-making was a common feature that all ancient and medieval kingdoms in Assam utilised for legitimacy to various degrees, for example in the other medieval kingdoms such as the Chutia and Kachari kingdoms, the Ahoms were able to use their alternate Lengdon-based legitimacy to effectively negotiate with the indigenous people; but the Tungkhungia kings veered towards Saktism and the persecution of the shudra Mahantas and their laity that began during the reign of Siva Singha ultimately led to the Moamoria rebellion and ultimately the eclipse of the kingdom.

Mong Dun Shun Kham
Sukaphaa (1228–1268) spent a couple of decades moving from place to place establishing colonies and finally settled down in Charaideo in 1253.Charaideo in the Sanskritised version of the Ahom name Che-Tam-Doi.  He established the offices of the Dangarias— the Burhagohain (Chao-Frongmung) and the Borgohain (Chao-Thaonmung).  In the 1280s, these two offices were given independent regions of control; partly hereditary and partly elected, the king and the two counsellors held each other in check and balance.  These institutions of checks and balances thus seeded held fast for six hundred years—in the 18th century John Peter Wade, a British officer, observed these unique institutions and novel system of government. Sukaphaa had instructed that events during his rule be chronicled, a practice sustained by his successors; and there emerged the institution of Buranji writing, a practice of historiography rare in India. In the late medieval era, the Ahom kingdom was known to be a kaghazi raj (a kingdom with records) just as the Mughal Empire was.

At the time of their advent, the Ahoms came with advanced technologies of rice cultivation, and it was their belief that they were divinely ordained to turn fallow land to agriculture and also to absorb stateless and shifting agriculturists to their own ways.  The shifting people were called kha and many such kha people were ceremonially adopted into different Ahom clans, a process called Ahomisation.  Sukaphaa befriended those among the Morans and Barahi who were amenable to join him and put to the sword those who opposed him, and in due course, many others were incorporated into Ahom clans.  The Ahoms were acutely aware of their smaller numbers, and adroitly avoided confrontations with larger groups. The additions via Ahomisation enhanced the Ahom numbers significantly. This process of Ahomization was particularly significant till the 16th century when under Suhungmung, the kingdom made large territorial expansions at the cost of the Chutiya and the Kachari kingdoms.

At this initial stage the kingdom was still not fully sovereign.  Sukaphaa sent his word of allegiance and tributes to Mong Mao, a practice that was continued by some of his successors till about the early 14th century when the power of Mong Mao faded to be replaced the power of Mong Kwang, at which point the Ahoms stopped the tributes.  The Ahoms began to call their domain Mong Dun Sun Kham ("a country of golden gardens").  Though Sukaphaa had avoided the Namdang region mindful of the numerically small Ahom contingent, but his son Suteuphaa made the Kacharis withdraw on their own via a stratagem and the Ahoms expanded into it; but no further expansions of the Ahom domain occurred for the next two hundred years.  The Ahom kingdom, for most of its history, had been closed and population movement closely monitored—nevertheless, there were two significant contacts. One was a friendly encounter with Chutia kingdom that turned into a conflict, and the other was a marriage alliance with the Kamata kingdom. At the end of the 14th century, the nascent Ahom polity faced crises of succession, two regicides, and three quick interregnum periods when the kingdom was without a king.

Assam
Sudangphaa Bamuni Konwar, born and raised in a Brahmin household in Habung, was identified as a descendant of a past king and installed on the throne by the Burhaohain and Borgohain. He established Brahmin officers, advisors and communities near the capital and the Brahmin influence, though negligible, was felt for the first time.  A number of rebellions erupted purportedly against this influence and Sudangphaa was able to suppress them and solidify his rule.  One of the rebels invited a military expedition from Mong Kwang (called Nara in the Buranjis, the successor state of Mong Mao to which the early Ahom kings used to send tribute) in 1401, but Sudangphaa defeated the expedition with the result that the boundary between the two polities were fixed at Patkai. This event was significant since it moved the Ahom polity from implicit subordination to explicit sovereignty, and this was accompanied by the transition of the name of the polity from Mong-Dun-Sun-Kham to "Assam", a derivative from Shan/Shyam. Sudangphaa established a new capital at Charagua, broke the clan allegiances that held the Ahom polity together earlier replacing it with political authority, and introduced the tradition of the singarigharutha ceremony, the state coronation of the Ahom kings that symbolised royal Ahom sovereignty, authority and legitimacy. Sudangphaa brought the Ahom kingdom very close to a full-fledged state.

The next hundred years saw the kingdom mostly suppressing rebellious Naga groups, but a conflict with the Dimasa kingdom in 1490 saw the Ahoms suing for peace, and not strong enough to take them on frontally.  The alliance that the Ahom royalty had developed with the Brahmans was progressively strengthening.

Full state and expansion

The Ahom kingdom transitioned into a full state rather dramatically in a short period during the reign of Suhungmung Dihingia Raja.  It began first with a consolidation of the militia in 1510, followed by an expansion into the Bhuyan region at Habung in 1512 (probably with the help of the descendants of the Habungia Brahmans settled during Sudangpha's time). The Indo-Aryan Bhuyans were relocated to the capital and absorbed into the lower echelons of the growing state as scribes and warriors. They in turn helped in the elimination of the royalty of the advanced Chutia kingdom in 1523; and that kingdom's nobility, commanders, professional classes, warriors and technologies were absorbed into the Ahom kingdom. It was this formation of the Ahom kingdom that met the aggression from Bengal under Turbak in 1532 and it was able to eliminate the aggressive leadership (with significant loss to itself) and pursue the retreating invaders to the Karatoya river.  In 1536, after the series of contacts with the Kachari kingdom, the Ahom rule extended up to the Kolong river in Nagaon; and by the end of Suhungmung's reign, the size of the kingdom had effectively doubled.

These expansions created significant changes in the kingdom—the Assamese speaking Hindu subjects outnumbered the Ahoms themselves; and the absorption of the Chutia kingdom meant a wide range of artisan skills became available to it increasing the scope for division of labour.  To provide legitimacy to the rule of the Ahom kings among the new subjects Suhungmung assumed the title Swarganarayana (Swargadeo), though nothing like the Rajputisation process occurred with the Ahoms.  The nature of the kings institutional relationship to the ministers changed with the creation of a new position, the Borpatrogohain, named after a Chutia office;"The king succeeded in tilting the constitutional balance in his favour, partly because of the long felt need for an expanded administration, but largely because his position had meanwhile been strengthened by a number of war victories."  and the creation of the offices of Sadiyakhowa Gohain (territories acquired from the Chutia kingdom) and the Marangikhowa Gohain (territories acquired from the Kachari kingdom), both of which were reserved for the Borgohain and Burhagohain lineages. The traditional nobles (Chao) now aligned with the Brahmin literati and an expanded ruling class developed. And when the Ahoms under Ton Kham Borgohain pursued the invaders and reached the Karatoya river they began to see themselves as the rightful heir of the erstwhile Kamarupa kingdom.

Mature state

The Ahom kingdom took many features of its mature form under Pratap Singha.  The Paik system was reorganized under the professional khel system, replacing the kinship-based  system.  Under the same king, the offices of the Borphukan, and the Borbarua were established along with other smaller offices. No more major restructuring of the state structure was attempted until the end of the kingdom.   In 1616, the Battle of Samdhara was fought with the Mughals in which the Mughals had a disastrous defeat , this battle also marked the beginning of  Ahom–Mughal conflicts which lasted the till 1682.

Jayadhwaj Singha in 1657 taking advantage of instability of the Mughals during the (War of succession), crossed Barnadi, the recognised boundary of the Mughal Kamrup on the east, and advanced towards Guwahati, defeated the faujdar of Guwahati.  And became the master of Guwahati. The Mughal faujdar Mir Lutfullah,  fled to Dacca, abondaning Kamrup, taking every opportunity Jayadhwaj Singha pushed as far as Sherpur in Mymensingh District of Bangladesh and the northern part of Sylhet, and the latter place was fortified and garrisoned. Arrangements were made to control the newly conquered tracts. The whole of Brahmaputra Valley, from Sadiya on the east to Sherpur on south was brought under the Ahom domains under one sway, this is also the time when the Ahom state attained the greatest territorial expansion. For nearly three years, the Ahoms remained in undisputed possession of the newly conquered tracts.

In 1662,  Aurangzeb  to bring the lost tracts and to punish the rebels elements in that quarter, launched an invasion under his chief lieutenant Mir Jumla II, in this invasion the Ahoms couldn't resist up well , and the Mughals occupied the capital, Garhgaon. Unable to keep it, and in at the end of the Battle of Saraighat, the Ahoms not only fended off a major Mughal invasion but extended their boundaries west, up to the Manas river. The western border was fixed at Manas river after the Battle of Itakhuli, which remained the same till the annexation by the British.

Following the Battle of Saraighat, the kingdom fell into 10 years of political unrest, where the ministers held more power and influence than the kings themselves.  This was first engineered due to a religious dispute. The first minister to hold this influence was Debera Borbarua, succeeded by Atan Burhagohain and then Laluksola Borphukan who even surrendered Guwahati back to the Mughal in his bid to become the king. During this period 7 kings were placed and deposed. The political unrest was put to a pause by Gadadhar Singha, and established the Tungkhungia regime, a sub clan of princes, which ruled till the end of the kingdom.

Tungkhungia regime

Swargadeo Gadadhar Singha (1682–1696) established the Tungkhungia regime in Assam with iron hands in 1682 after suppressing all the internal conflicts and conspiracies, which lasted till the down fall of the kingdom in 1826. Also in 1682 he had defeated the Mughals in the Battle of Itakhuli. Gadadhar Singha had directly came into conflict with the Vaisnava Satras of Assam, who began to exercise immense power over the state and the nobles and started a ruthless persecution of the fake kewalaiya bhakats (fake disciples).

The rule of Tungkhungia Ahom kings was marked by achievements in the Arts and engineering constructions, the Tungkhungia reigme witnessed a relative time of peace and stability till the Moamoria rebellion, also festering internal conflicts that tore the kingdom asunder. According to Guha (1986)  Ahom Assam continued to flourish till 1770. The Tungkhungia regime witnessed a relative time of peace till first half of the 18th century, where the population increased, trade expanded, Coinage and monetization made headway. New arts and crafts, new crops and even new style of dress were introduced.

Rudra Singha (1696–1714) during his reign the kingdom reached its zenith, he had subjugated the Jayantia and the Kachari kingdoms and, abandoned the policy of isolation and encouraged trade with different parts of the world, he had also planned to organise a confederacy of Hindu rulers to invade Bengal. Rudra Singha was a devout hindu, he had invited Parvatiya Gosain alias Krishnaram Bhattacharya to take his initiation/sharan and promised him to be given take care of Kamakhya Temple, this factor had a great significance in the history of Assam,  Rudra Singha had also expressed from his deathbed that all his sons should become kings in order, which was in violation of the law of primogeniture nature of Ahom kingship.  He introduced Islamic prayers in the court that his successors continued.

All Ahom kings from Siva Singha to Rajeswar Singha were disciples of Parvatiya Gosain or his relatives, Lakshmi Singha (1769–1780) was refused initiation by Parvatiya Gosain because of his based illegitimacy, so he had taken initiation of new Sakta priest Ramananda Acharyya alias Pahumariya Gosain because of his establishment in Pahumara, Gaurinath Singha had taken initiation from the son of Pahumariya Gosain. Again from Kamaleswar Singha had reverted to Ekasarana Dharma.
His son and successor Siva Singha had dropped his father plan to invade Bengal but he accepted the initiation of Krishnaram Bhattacharya Nyayavagish according to his father's advice and became an orthodox Hindu Sakta. Siva Singha was greatly influenced by the Brahmana priest and astrologers. He installed his chief queens as de facto rulers because of evil consequences of the evil chatra-bhanga-yoga as predicted by his spiritual guides and astrologers in 1722, his chief queen Phuleshwari was made the de facto ruler who assumed the title of Bor Raja or the 'chief king' and the name of Pramateswari, after the death of Phuleswari in 1731 there were two more successive Bor Rajas, Ambika and Sarbeshwari till the death of Siva Singha in 1744. Reign of Siva Singha witnessed the golden age and Assamese manuscripts and temple buildings and a time of internal  peace, there was no war in his reign expect a Dafla attack in 1717 who rose into revolt and were easily suppressed and subdueded. During his reign three great ponds which got the title of Sagar (ocean), were dug up- Sivasagar Tank, Gaurisagar Tank and the Lakshmisagar Tank, and in the surrounding, temples were constructed. Beside that in Lower Assam numerous temples were erected or reconstructed through Tarun Duara Borphukan by the orders of Siva Singha.

Siva Singha was succeeded by his younger brother Pramatta Singha, his reign was peacefull with no internal conspiracies expect a failed attempt to capture the palace by the Tipam Raja. Pramatta Singha had constructed the famous Rang Ghar with bricks, and had constructed many temples.
Pramatta Singha was succeeded by his younger brother Rajeswar Singha in 1751.
Reign of Rajeswar Singha was also peacefull, Rajeswar Singha was an orthodox Hindu, and witnessed the last days of the Ahom glory and power. In 1762 there was an expedition to Manipur to expel the Burmese out of the Manipuri throne, and an army of 40,000 men was sent under the command of Harnath Senapati Phukan, but was a complete fail even before reaching Manipur, however a second contingent was sent under the Command of Kirti Chandra Borbarua through the route of Raha and the Kachari kingdom. The army which consisted of 10,000 troops proceeded far as the Merap river and recovered the Manipuri throne from the Burmese. Later the Manipuri King  Ching-Thang Khomba or Jai Singh send many gifts to the ahom king including his daughter Kuranganayani for mairrage to the king. Rajeswar Singha constructed many temples including the Negheriting Shiva Doul and the administrative buildings of Talatal Ghar and Kareng Ghar, Rajeswar Singha died in 1769 and the throne was passed to Lakshmi Singha through the mechanism of Kirti Chandra Borbarua. Reign of Lakshmi Singha witnessed the first Moamoria rebellion and the subsequent downfall of the Ahom kingdom  Astabhujdeva the Mayamara Mahanta had made a prediction that a disaster will befall with the accession of Lakshmi Singha

Down fall

The Ahom kingdom by the mid-18th century was indeed an over-burdened hierarchical  structure, supported by a weak institutional  base and meagre economic surplus. The Paik system which in the 17th century had helped the kingdom to repulse the repeated Mughal invasions, had become extremely outdated. The later phase of the rule was also marked by increasing social conflicts, leading to the Moamoria rebellion were able to capture and maintain power at the capital Rangpur for some years but were finally removed with the help of the British under Captain Welsh.  The following repression led to a large depopulation due to emigration as well as execution, but the conflicts were never resolved.  A much-weakened kingdom fell to repeated Burmese attacks and finally after the Treaty of Yandabo in 1826, the control of the kingdom passed into British hands.

Ahom economic system

The Ahom kingdom was based on the Paik system, a type of corvee labor that is neither feudal nor Asiatic. The first coins were introduced by Jayadhwaj Singha in the 17th century, though the system of personal service under the Paik system persisted. In the 17th century when the Ahom kingdom expanded to include erstwhile Koch and Mughal areas, it came into contact with their revenue systems and adapted accordingly.

Trade
Trade was carried on usually through barter and use of circulation of money was limited. According to Shihabududdin Tailash, currency in the Ahom kingdom consisted of cawries, rupees and gold coins. With the increase of external trade since the reign of Rudra Singha, there was a corresponding increase in the circuation of money. Inscriptions dating from the reign of Siva Singha, gives the price of number of commodities like rice, ghee, oil, pulses, goat, pegion in connection with worship in different temples of the kingdom. This concludes that the barter economey was in the process of being replaced by the money economy, which was the outcome of Assam's developing economic ties both with feudal India and the neighbouring countries of the north east.

Trade with Tibet
Due to trade with Tibet, a coin of Jayadhwaj Singha carries a single Chinese character on each side reading Zang Bao. This had been translated as 'treasury of your honour'. Nicholas Rodhes read the inscription as 'Currency of Tibet', Also these two characters were used by the Chinese in Lhasa between 1792 and 1836 with the meaning 'Tibetan currency. Furthermore, there was a significant contact between China and tibet in the mid-seventeen century, so it is not unlikely that the Assamese would have thought have thought that a Chinese character was an appropriate for Assamese-Tibetan trade coin. This piece evidently was an attempt by Jayadhwaj Singha to facilitate trade with Chinese knowing person coming from the direction of Tibet.  Rudra Singha is also said to have established an extensive trade with Tibet and to have encouraged intercourse with other nations although he strictly limited the extent to which foreigners were allowed into the country. Presumably, some of the coins of his reign were struck with the silver earned from these trading activities.

Another point by which we can understand the trade relation of Ahoms with other nations is through the use of Silver coins. It is to be noted that there are no silver mines in the northeast or in the rest of India, so the metal entered as a result of trade.

Extent
In extent the kingdom's length was about 500 miles (800 km) and with an average breadth of 60 miles (96 km). The kingdom can be divided into three major regions: the north bank (Uttarkul), the south bank (Dakhinkul), and the island of Majuli. The north bank (Uttarkul) was more populated and fertile but the Ahom kings set up their capital on the south bank (Dakinkul) because it had more inaccessible strongholds and defensible central places.

Demographics
Population
From 1500 to 1770 A.D., one comes across definite signs of demographic growth in the region. There was terrible depopulation In course of the Moamoria rebellion (1769–1805) when more than half of the population fell off. Again, during the Burmese regime, the Burmese depredations (1817-1825) further reduced the population by 1/3. It shows that only 7/8 lakh people remained, at the time of British annexation. King Pratap Singha is who, systematised the population distribution and settlement of villages. The census of adult male population of the state was taken very strictly so that every working man would be registered for the state service.  The census were properly recorded in registers called paikar piyalar kakat.

The following table estimates the population composition of Ahom Kingdom during the reign of king Rajeswar Singha (1751-1769). According to the population estimates computed by Gunabhiram Barua.

During the reign of Pratap Singha (1603–1641), excluding the territory of Kamrup, the relevant adult male population between (15–60 age group) is estimated to be 4.2 lakhs and later 6.1 lakhs. The total population during the reign of Pratap Singha is estimated by Guha to be 1,680,000 and 2,440,000 respectively during the time frame of 1615–1620. 1669, the total population fell, meanwhile during to lingering the Ahom–Mughal conflicts and a severe drought in 1665. The total adult population in 1669 is estimated to be 4 lakhs. The total population is estimated to be 1,600,000 in 1669. These population estimates till now are excluding Kamrup.

In the reign of Rudra Singha (1696-1714). For his preparation to invade Bengal he collected 4,00,000 soldiers, while 3,60,000 were native Assamese the other 40,000 soldiers were collected from the vassals. The militia register in his state revealed that 2,60,000 paiks could be mobilized if the combatants (Kanri) alone were called up, and 3,60,000 paiks, if the non-combatants (Chamua). The population during Rudra Singha reign is estimated to be, including Kamrup, 2,880,000 as per Guha.

 Urbanization 
There were towns, but only a small percentage of the population lived in such towns. Some important towns of Ahom time were Rangpur, Garhgoan, Guwahati and, Hajo and etc. The capital city of Rangpur, was found to be 20 miles (32.18 km) in extent and thickly populated by Capt. Welsh in 1794. The population, however, never exceeded 10 thousand souls.

Ahom administration

 Swargadeo and Patra Mantris 
The Ahom kingdom was ruled by a king, called Swargadeo (Ahom language: Chao-Pha), who had to be a descendant of the first king Sukaphaa.  Succession was generally by primogeniture but occasionally the great Gohains (Dangarias) could elect another descendant of Sukaphaa from a different line or even depose an enthroned one.

Dangarias: Sukaphaa had two great Gohains to aid him in administration: Burhagohain and the Borgohain. In the 1280s, they were given independent territories, they were veritable sovereigns in their given territories called bilat or rajya. The Burhagohain's territory was between Sadiya and Gerelua river in the north bank of the Brahmaputra river and the Borgohain's territory was to the west up to the Burai river. They were given total command over the paiks that they controlled. These positions were generally filled from specific families. Princes who were eligible for the position of Swargadeo were not considered for these positions and vice versa. In the 1527, Suhungmung added a third Gohain, Borpatrogohain. The Borpatrogohain's territory was located between the territories of the other two Gohains.

Royal officers: Pratap Singha added two offices, Borbarua and Borphukan, that were directly under the king.  The Borbarua, who acted as the military as well as the judicial head, was in command of the region east of Kaliabor not under the command of the Dangarias.  He could use only a section of the paiks at his command for his personal use (as opposed to the Dangariyas), the rest rendering service to the Ahom state.  The Borphukan was in military and civil command over the region west of Kaliabor, and acted as the Swargadeo's viceroy in the west. Borbaruas were mostly from different Moran, Kachari, Chiring and Khamti communities, while Borphukans were from the Chutia community. The Borbarua and Borphukan offices were not hereditary and thus could be chosen from any families.

Patra Mantris: The five positions constituted the Patra Mantris (Council of Ministers).  From the time of Supimphaa (1492–1497), one of the Patra Mantris was made the Rajmantri (Prime Minister, also Borpatro; Ahom language: Shenglung) who enjoyed additional powers and the service of a thousand additional paiks from the Jakaichuk village.

Other officials
The Borbarua and the Borphukan had military and judicial responsibilities, and they were aided by two separate councils (sora) of Phukans.  The Borphukan's sora sat at Guwahati and the Borbarua's sora at the capital. Six of them formed the council of the Borbarua with each having his separate duties. The Naubaicha Phukan, who had an allotment of thousand men managed the royal boats, the Bhitarual Phukan, the Na Phukan, the Dihingia Phukan, the Deka Phukan, and the Neog Phukan formed the council of Phukan. The Borphukan also had a similar council of six subordinate Phukans whom he was bound to consult in all matters of importance. This council included Pani Phukan, who commanded six thousand paiks, Deka Phukan who commanded four thousand paiks, the Dihingia Phukan, Nek Phukan and two Chutiya Phukans.

The superintending officers were called Baruas.  The Baruas of whom there were twenty or more included Bhandari Barua or treasurer; the Duliya Barua, who was in charge of the royal palanquins; the Chaudang Barua who superintended executions; Khanikar Barua was the chief artificer; Sonadar Barua was the mint master and chief jeweler; the Bez Barua was the physician to the Royal family, Hati Barua, Ghora Barua, etc.
Other officials included twelve Rajkhowas, and a number of Katakis, Kakatis, and Dolais. The Rajkhowas were governors of given territories and commanders of three thousand paiks. They were the arbitrator who settled local disputes and supervised public works. The Katakis were envoys who dealt with foreign countries and hill tribes. The Kakatis were writers of official documents.  The Dolais expounded astrology and determined auspicious time and dates for any important event and undertaking.

Governors
Members of the royal families ruled certain areas, and they were called Raja.
 Charing Raja, the heir apparent to the Swargadeo, administered the tracts around Joypur on the right bank of the Burhidihing river.
 Tipam Raja is the second in line.
 Namrup Raja is the third in line

Members of the royal families who occupy lower positions are given regions called mels, and were called meldangia or  raja.  Meldangia Gohains were princes of an even lesser grade, of which there were two: Majumelia Gohain and Sarumelia Gohain.

Royal ladies were given individual mels, and by the time of Rajeshwar Singha, there were twelve of them.  The most important of these was the Raidangia mel given to the chief queen.

Forward governors, who were military commanders, ruled and administered forward territories.  The officers were usually filled from the families that were eligible for the three great Gohains.Sadiya Khowa Gohain based in Sadiya, administered the Sadiya region that was acquired after the conquest of the Chutia kingdom in 1524.
 Marangi khowa Gohain administered the region that was contiguous to the Naga groups west of the Dhansiri; acquired from the Kachari kingdom in 1526.
 Solal Gohain administered a great part of Nagaon and a portion of Chariduar after the headquarters of the Borphukan was transferred to Gauhati.
 Kajalimukhiya Gohain served under the Borphukan, administered Kajalimukh and maintained relations with Jaintia and Dimarua.
 Khamjangia Gohain administered the region of Khamjang (part of Naga hills).
 Banrukia Gohain administered the region of Banruk (part of Sibsagar district).
 Tungkhungia Gohain administered the region of Tingkhong.
 Banlungia Gohain administered the region of Banlung (Dhemaji) that was acquired after the conquest of the Chutia kingdom in 1524.
 Bhatialia Gohain administered the region of Habung acquired from the Chutia kingdom in 1524. Later Borpatrogohain was created in its place.
 Dihingia Gohain administered the region of Mungklang (Dihing) that was acquired after the conquest of the Chutiya kingdom in 1524.
 Kaliaboria Gohain administered the region of Kaliabor.
 Jagiyal Gohain served under Borbarua, administered Jagi at Nagoan and maintained relations with seven tribal chiefs, called Sat Raja.
 Mohongia Gohain and Mohongor Gohain based in the salt mines of Sadiya and Mohong (Naga hills) conquered from Chutia kingdom and Nagas.

Lesser governors were called Rajkhowas, and some of them were:
 Bacha
 Darrang
 Solaguri
 Abhaypur
 Tapakuchi

 Vassals 
The dependent kings or vassals were also called Raja.  Except for the Raja of Rani, all paid an annual tribute.  These Rajas were required to meet the needs for resources and paiks when the need arose, as during the time of war. There were in total 15 vassal states.
 Darrang Raja ruled the later-day Darrang district and were the descendants of Sundar Narayan, a great-grandson of Chilarai of the Koch dynasty.
 Rani
 Beltola ruled the tracts southwest of Guwahati and were the descendants of Gaj Narayan, a grandson of Chilarai of the Koch dynasty
 Luki
 Barduar
 Dimarua
 Gobha
 Neli

The other hill states which acknowledged the overlordship and nominal sovereignty of the Ahoms were the states of:

 Jaintia Kingdom
 Dimasa Kingdom
 Manipur Kingdom

 Khyrim

The states of Jaintia and Dimasa paid annual tributes to the Ahom king, acknowledging the overlordship and the vassalage of Ahoms. In this connection, mention be made of the term thapita sanchita (established and preserved) which determined their relationship with the Ahoms.

Paik officials
The Ahom kingdom was dependent on the Paik system, a form of corvee labor, reorganized in 1608 by Momai Tamuli Barbarua.  Every common subject was a paik, and four paiks formed a got.  At any time of the year, one of the paiks in the got rendered direct service to the king, as the others in his got tended to his fields.  The Paik system was administered by the Paik officials:  A Bora was in charge of 20 paiks, a Saikia of 100 and a Hazarika of 1000.  A Rajkhowa commanded three thousand and a Phukan commanded six thousand paiks.

Land survey
Supatphaa became acquainted with the land measurement system of Mughals during the time he was hiding in Kamrup before he succeeded to the throne. As soon as the wars with Mughals were over he issued orders for the introduction of a similar system throughout his dominions. Surveyors were imported from Koch Behar and Bengal for the work. It was commenced in Sibsagar and was pushed on vigorously, but it was not completed until after his death. Nagaon was next surveyed, and the settlement which followed was supervised by Rudra Singha himself. Four 'bigha' makes one 'Pura'. A similar land measurement system is still being followed in modern Assam.

The measurement system helped in the equal distribution of land among the paiks as well as among the nobles and officers. Records of land were maintained under an officer called Darabdhara Barua. Thus all cultivable and occupied land, except homesteads and jungles, were surveyed and recorded. The paper on which this was recorded is called perakagaz or perakakat meaning (paper carefully preserved inside of wooden boxes called pera). As the perakagaz were not durable, copper plates called as tamrapatraor phali were issued for important records, particularly of revenue-free lands gifted to religious sites or to Brahamanas.
 Military 

 
The Ahom military forces included infantry, cavalry, Elephantry, Artillery, Spies and Navy. Land was given to Martial Paiks or peasants in exchange for service. They were organised under various head. Bora was the leader of twenty paiks, Saikia was the leader of a hundred or more, and Hazarika was the leader of a thousand, a Barua was leader of 2000 soldiers, a Rajkowa a leader of 3000 soldiers and a Phukan of 6000 soldiers. The army's commander-in-chief was known as Borphukan. Swords, spears, bows, and arrows, guns, matchlocks, cannons were the primary weapons of the war. The soldiers had been trained to stand firm in battle. The cavalry commander was Ghora Barua, and the elephant commander was Hati Barua.

The people of mediaeval Assam were aware of the use of incendiary weapons. However, firearms were first introduced in the early 16th century. The Ahom troops quickly became experts in the manufacture of various types of guns, small and large, matchlocks, artillery, and large cannon. Kharghariya Phukan was the officer in charge of the manufacture of gunpowder.

The navy was the most important and powerful division of the Ahom forces. The main warships were known as bacharis. This shape was similar to Bengali kosahs, and each could carry 70 to 80 men. They were tough and powerful, and by the end of the period, many of them were armed with guns. The Fathiya-i-ibriya mentions 32,000 ships belonging to the king of Assam at the time of Mir Jumla's invasion. These were primarily made of chambal wood and were thus light and fast and so difficult to sink. The navy was led by the Naobaicha Phukan and Naosaniya Phukan.

Forts were built in strategic locations to provide armed resistance. The Ahom soldiers were skilled at attacking the enemy at night. On the battlefield, a small group of Ahom soldiers could often outnumber thousands of enemy soldiers. Aside from their numerical strength, the Ahom paiks' physical strength, courage, and endurance were the most important factors in the Ahom military's invincibility.

Strength
The numerical strength of Pratap Singha army consisted of 100,000 foot soldiers, 1,000 war elephants and a large fleet, estimated by the author of Badshahnama. The same king army at a different time was estimated by the author of  Baharistan-i-Ghaibi at 300,000 foot soldiers, 180 war elephants and 4,000 war-boats. In  1669, the combined strength of the Infantry and cavalry under the command of the Ahoms was estimated at 1 lakh. Rudra Singha had raised a huge army of 4,00,000 to invade  Bengal in November of 1714. 

Judicial Administration
In civil matters, Hindu laws were generally followed, while the criminal law was characterized by sternness and comparative harshness, where the general principle was that of an eye for an eye and a tooth for a tooth, and the culprit was punished with precisely the same injury as that inflicted by him on the complainant. The Barbarua and the Barphukan were the chief judicial authorities in their respective provinces, and trials were conducted before them.

The punishment of the crimes were generally harsh, the offenders were punished by various manners like- by impaling, grinding between two cylinders, starving to death, slicing of the body in pieces, hoeing from head to foot etc. The common punishments were- extraction of eyes and knee caps, slicing off nose, beating with sticks etc.

Classes of people
 
Subinphaa (1281–1293), the third Ahom king, delineated the Satgharia Ahom ("Ahom of the seven houses") aristocracy: the Chaophaa, the Burhagohain and the Borgohain families, and four priestly lineages—the Deodhai, the Mohan, the Bailung and the Chiring Phukan .  These lines maintained exogamous marital relationships.  The number of lineages increased in later times as either other lineages were incorporated, or existing lineages divided.  The king could belong to only the first family whereas the Burhagohain and the Borgohain only to the second and the third families.  Most of the Borphukans belonged to the Chutia ethnic group, whereas the Borbaruas belonged to the Morans, Chiring and Khamti groups. Later on Naga, Mising and Nara (Mongkawng) oracles became a part of the Bailung group. The extended nobility consisted of the landed aristocracy and the spiritual class that did not pay any form of tax.

The  was the gentry that was freed from the khels and paid only money-tax.  The paikan chamua consisted of artisans, the literati and skilled people that did non-manual work and rendered service as a tax.  The kanri paik rendered manual labor.  The lowest were the licchous, bandi-beti and other serfs and bondsmen.  There was some degree of movement between the classes. Momai Tamuli Borbarua rose from a bondsman through the ranks to become the first Borbarua under Prataap Singha.

Culture

Music and dance
 
The culture of dance and music was widespread and the most popular manifestation of it was Bihu. Different styles of dances were performed Queen Phuleshwari was originally attached to Siva temple at Dergaon. Many types of musical instruments were used. Mughal music performances like Nageras under the Royal patronage were introduced. Rudra Singha had right regards for Mughal music and sent Assamese musicians to Delhi to learn the playing of the instruments like Pakhuaj. The king also appointed certain officers like Gyan barua, for the promotion of music and art. The Assamese monarchs Rudra Singha and his son Siva Singha were both writers of songs. Rajeswar Singha was the author of a drama entitled Kichak Bandh''. To celebrate the visit of the Rajas of Manipur and Cachar, a Bhaona  entitled as Ravan-Badh, was performed at the Ahom capital Rangpur, Assam and the master of the performance was the Deka-Barbarua, son of Kirti Chandra Barbarua, in this Bhaona 700 men took part.

Architecture

The metropolis at Rangpur contains the famous Talatal Ghar,  Rang Ghar and in Garhgoan, Kareng Ghar.

Temples
The first temple thought to be constructed by Ahoms was in the banks of Karatoya by Suhungmung Dihingia Roja, after defeating and chasing the musalman invaders till Karatoya. The most notable temples of the Ahom period are the Sivasagar group of temples constructed between 1731 and 1734 these temples are dedicated to Shiva, Vishnu, and Devi. The Siva temple was built of stone and bricks and is one of the high-altitude Siva temples in India and is a place of great sanctity. Gaurisagar group of temples were constructed between 1715 and 1715 of which the Devi dol is the main temple, beside there is the other two temples dedicated to Siva and Vishnu. The Devi dol was built of stone and bricks, its stone artwork is best among the other Ahom temples, next to Joy dol. The Shiva dol of Gaurisagar is very much similar to that of Shiva dol of Sivasagar. The  Joysagar group of temples are standing on the bank of Joysagar tank. The temples were constructed in 1698 by Rudra Singha, the main tempe is the Joy dol or the Kesavaraya  Vishnu dol, this is the biggest temple based on Nilachal architecture after the Kamakhya Temple. The stone work of Joy dol is the finest among all the Ahom temples, beside Joy dol there are more temples dedicated to Shiva, Ganesha, Devi, and, Surya. Negheriting Shiva Dol constructed in 1765 by Rajeswar Singha.This temple is constructed of brick and stone and is built in Panchayatana style with the main temple in the middle and the subsidiary temple surrounding it, it is one of the most unique temples constructed by Ahoms. The other temples of the Ahoms are the Surya Mandir, the Ranganath Dol, the Fakua Dol and the Ganesa Mandir at Joysagar, the Visnu Dol on the bank of the Rudrasagar Tank near Bhatiapar, the Visnu Dol and the Jagatdhatri Dol at Kalogoan, the Visnu Dol and the Devi Dol on the bank of the Namti tank. The Mahesvara Ghar (Garakhia Dol) on the southern bank of the Dikhow river at Nazira, the Thowra Dol on the north-east of Sibsagar city, the Siva Dol on the bank of the Brahmaputra at Dergaon, the Piyali Phukanar Dol at Galeky, the Bezar Dol at Demow, Hara Gauri dol, Gauri Ballabh dol, and multiple temples at Lower Assam built through the Borphukan, etc. Apart from these there are a number of other temples which exist today only in ruins like the Bogi Dol near Joysagar, the Borpatra Dol at Kenduguri, the Keri Rajmao Dol at Mathichiga, the Ikhneswar Dol at Rangpur, the Govindra Dol at Gargaon, the Langkuri Dol, the Gota Dol at Charaideo, the Naphuki Rajmao Dol at Naphuk, the Sam Rajmao Dol at Nazira etc.

Tanks 
The excavations of tanks was one of the notable works system under Ahoms. There grandeur was enhanced by construction of temples in their bank. Among the largest of tank there is the Joysagar tank excavated by Rudra Singha in 1698, this tank covers a total area of 318 acres of which 155 acres in underwater, many notable temples were constructed on its bank. Phuleswari Devi had excavated the Gaurisagar or Namdangar puskarni in the chronicles, this tank was excavated on (17 Feb, 1724) and the excavation was completed in (30 June 1724). In includes a total area of 293 acre of which 150 acre is underwater, on its bank three temples are built dedicated to Devi, Shiva and Vishnu. Queen Ambika devi had excavated the Sivasagar Tank in 1733, it has a total area of 257 acre of which 127 acre is underwater. Besides this, there are some more great Tanks, like- Lakshmi Sagar, Vishu Sagar or Rajmao Pukhuri, and Rudra Sagar. The number of other tanks excavated by the Ahom rulers is estimated to be approximately, 200.

Painting

See also

 Ahom Dynasty
 Ahom–Mughal conflicts
 Treaty of Ghilajharighat
 Ramani Gabharu
 Koch–Ahom conflicts
 Mueang
 Möng Mao
 Paik system
 Singarigharutha ceremony
 Hengdang

Notes

References

 
 
 
 
 
 
 
 
 
 
 
 
 
 
 
 
 
 
 
 
 
 
 
 
 

 
Kingdoms of Assam
Tai history
Former monarchies of Asia
States and territories established in 1228
Medieval India
1228 establishments in Asia
1826 disestablishments in India
13th-century establishments in India
History of India